The Kukule Ganga Dam is a  gravity dam built across the Kukule River in Kalawana, Sri Lanka.

Dam and reservoir 
The gravity dam is built across the Kukule River, which is a major mid-basin tributary of the Kalu River.

Power station 
Water from the tunnel is fed into the  underground power station, consisting of two  units. This capacity was intentionally limited to  due to load issues. The power station generates an average of  annually.

See also 

 Electricity in Sri Lanka
 List of dams and reservoirs in Sri Lanka
 List of power stations in Sri Lanka

References 

Dams completed in 2005
Dams in Sri Lanka
Hydroelectric power stations in Sri Lanka
Japan International Cooperation Agency
Buildings and structures in Sabaragamuwa Province
Gravity dams